Cheonmasan  is a mountain in Gyeonggi-do, South Korea. It can be found within the boundaries of the city of Namyangju.

Origin of the Name 
At the end of the Goryeo dynasty a king once said 'This mountain is so high that you could touch the sky if your hand would be a little longer.' So it was called the mountain that can touch the sky, 'Cheonma Mountain'.

See also
List of mountains in Korea

Notes

References

Mountains of South Korea
Mountains of Gyeonggi Province
Namyangju